The Florida State Seminoles women's basketball team represents Florida State University (variously Florida State or FSU) in the intercollegiate sport of basketball. The Seminoles compete in the National Collegiate Athletic Association (NCAA) Division I and the Atlantic Coast Conference (ACC).

Florida State has made 21 NCAA tournament appearances, advancing to the Round of 32 on sixteen occasions, the Sweet Sixteen on five occasions, and the Elite Eight on three occasions. Florida State has also made one appearance in the National Women's Invitation Tournament and two appearances in the Women's National Invitation Tournament. The Seminoles have won the regular season conference title three times, including two ACC titles, and the conference tournament title once.

Florida State has had twenty All-Americans and five players inducted into the Hall of Fame, and several players have gone on to play in the Women's National Basketball Association (WNBA).
 
The Seminoles are coached by Brooke Wyckoff and play their home games in the Donald L. Tucker Center on the university's Tallahassee, Florida, campus.

Overview
The Florida State Seminoles women's team annually plays an eighteen-game conference schedule that is preceded by an out-of-conference schedule against few annual opponents except for Florida. Their conference schedule consists of a home-and-home game against two permanent rivals (Miami and Clemson), alternating home-and-home games against the other 14 ACC teams.

History
Florida State University has officially fielded a basketball team since 1970, and the Seminoles are currently in their 54th season of play.

Early history (1970–1997)
Barbara Hollingsworth served as the first basketball coach for the Florida State Seminoles. She coached at the school for one year.

Linda Warren became the second basketball coach for the Lady Seminoles. She also coached at the school for one year.

Eddie Cubbon became the third head coach, staying at the school for one season and compiling a record of 11–5.

Joel Thirer, the fourth coach in four years, compiled a 9–6 record in one season.

Millie Usher became the first coach at Florida State to stay at the school for multiple seasons. Throughout two seasons, she compiled a record of 27–28.

Dianne Murphy, the sixth coach of the program, compiled a 37–35 record in three seasons with the Noles.

Jan Dykehouse-Allen stayed at the school for seven years and was the first coach to compile over 100 victories, with a record of 111–108. She was also the first coach to lead the team to the NCAA tournament.

Marynell Meadors led the Seminoles for ten years to a record of 132–152 and two tournament appearances.

Chris Gobrecht left to coach her alma mater after a five-win season at Florida State, her only year at the school.

Modern history (1997–present)

Sue Semrau coached at Florida State for over 20 years. She led the Seminoles to 16 tournaments and was named the ACC Coach of the Year four times and the Associated Press Coach of the Year once. 

Semrau took a leave of absence for the 2020–21 season and Brooke Wyckoff, who had been serving as the associate head coach, served as the interim coach for the duration of that season. On March 21, 2022, Semrau announced her retirement.

On March 29, 2022, former player and assistant Brooke Wyckoff was announced as the head coach of the program.

Head coaches

Current coaching staff

Players

Current roster

Retired numbers

Notable alumni
Tanae Davis-Cain – professional WNBA basketball player, Detroit Shock
Sue Galkantas – 1983 finalist for the Wade Trophy
Roneeka Hodges – professional WNBA basketball player, Houston Comets
Jacinta Monroe – professional WNBA basketball player, Washington Mystics and Tulsa Shock
Britany Miller – professional WNBA basketball player, Detroit Shock
Tia Paschal – professional WNBA basketball player, Chicago Sting
Brooke Wyckoff – professional WNBA basketball player, Chicago Sky
Cierra Bravard – professional WNBA basketball player, Seattle Storm
Natasha Howard – professional WNBA basketball player, Indiana Fever, Seattle Storm

Florida State has sent 16 players to the WNBA draft.
Latavia Coleman (Houston Comets)
Brooke Wyckoff (Orlando Miracle)
Levys Torres (Miami Sol)
Roneeka Hodges (Houston Comets)
Britany Miller (Detroit Shock)
Tanae Davis-Cain (Detroit Shock)
Mara Freshour (Seattle Storm)
Jacinta Monroe (Washington Mystics)
Natasha Howard (Indiana Fever)
Adut Bulgak (New York Liberty)
Leticia Romero (Connecticut Sun)
Kai James (New York Liberty)
Shakayla Thomas (Los Angeles Sparks)
Imani Wright (Phoenix Mercury)
Maria Conde (Chicago Sky)
Kiah Gillespie (Chicago Sky)

Championships

NWIT championship appearance
Florida State has appeared in the National Women's Invitation Tournament's National Championship game once, in 1982. The Seminoles, coached by Jan Dykehouse-Allen, lost to Oregon State, 76–60, at the Amarillo Civic Center in Amarillo, Texas.

Conference tournament championships

Conference Affiliations

1970–1980: Independent
1980–1991: Metro Conference
1991–present: Atlantic Coast Conference

Conference regular season championships

Records and results

Year-by-year results

Note: W = Wins, L = Losses, C = Conference

*Wins vacated as part of the academic scandal

Record vs. rivals

All-time record vs. ACC teams

ACC-Big Ten Challenge
The Seminoles have participated in the ACC-Big Ten Women's Challenge 15 times, compiling a record of 13–2, with ten consecutive wins in the series.

Polls
Florida State has ended their basketball season ranked 12 times in at least one of the AP and Coaches Polls.
Top-10 finishes are colored ██

A fourth-place ranking is the best the team has ever received.

Post-season
Florida State has appeared in the postseason 24 times.

NCAA tournament Results
The Seminoles have appeared in 21 NCAA tournaments, with a record of 24-21.

NWIT
The Seminoles appeared in the National Women's Invitation Tournament on one occasion.

WNIT
The Seminoles have appeared in the Women's National Invitation Tournament twice.

ACC tournament

Florida State has a record of 14–29 at the ACC women's basketball tournament.

Awards
ACC Player of the Year
Shakayla Thomas (2017)

ACC Defensive Player of the Year 
Christian Hunnicutt (2011)

ACC Rookie of the Year
Ta’Niya Latson (2023)

ACC Sixth Player of the Year 
Chasity Clayton (2013)
Shakayla Thomas (2015, 2016)
Chatrice White (2017)

ACC Most Improved Player
Makayla Timpson (2023)

ACC Coach of the Year
Sue Semrau (2001, 2005, 2009, 2015)

ACC Women's Basketball Legend 
Cherry Rivers (2015)

AP Coach of the Year
Sue Semrau (2015)

WBCA Coach of the Year
Sue Semrau (2015)

All-Americans
Cierra Bravard
Adut Bulgak
Bev Burnett
Wanda Burns
Chris Davis
Christy Derlak
Nicki Ekhomu
Sue Galkantas
Kiah Gillespie
Natasha Howard
Ta’Niya Latson
Jacinta Monroe
Tia Paschal
Allison Peercy
Lorraine Rimson
Leticia Romero
Danielle Ryan
Shakayla Thomas
Imani Wright
Brooke Wyckoff

Home court

Donald L. Tucker Center

The Seminoles play all of their home games at the Donald L. Tucker Center. It is a  multi-purpose facility which has hosted over 25 years worth of Seminole games.

See also
Florida State Seminoles
Florida State Seminoles men's basketball
History of Florida State University
List of Florida State University professional athletes

References

Bibliography
Florida State Seminoles Women's Basketball Media Guide, University Athletic Association, Tallahassee, Florida

External links